Negousse Mengistou (born 11 March 1932) is a former Ethiopian cyclist. He competed at the 1956 Summer Olympics and the 1960 Summer Olympics.

References

External links
 

1932 births
Living people
Ethiopian male cyclists
Olympic cyclists of Ethiopia
Cyclists at the 1956 Summer Olympics
Cyclists at the 1960 Summer Olympics
People from Gondar
Sportspeople from Amhara Region
20th-century Ethiopian people